Suliman Ad-Dharrath Arena is an indoor sporting arena located in Benghazi, Libya.  It is used mainly for indoor sports such as volleyball and basketball.  It has a seating capacity of 2,000 people and was opened in 1967.

It was one of two host arenas for the 2009 African Basketball Championship.

Indoor arenas in Libya
Buildings and structures in Benghazi
Basketball venues in Libya
Volleyball venues in Libya